Sŏp'o station is a railway station in Sŏp'o-dong, Hyongjesan-guyŏk, P'yŏngyang, North Korea. It is on located on the P'yŏngra and P'yŏngŭi lines of the Korean State Railway.

History
The station was opened on 1 April 1908, along with the rest of the former Kyŏngŭi Line, from which the P'yŏngŭi line was formed after the division of Korea.

Operations
There is an international cargo terminal at the station, which handles international freight traffic between P'yŏngyang and China. All passenger trains heading to and from P'yŏngyang on the P'yŏngra and P'yŏngŭi lines pass through this station.

References

Railway stations in North Korea